Leyendas Legendarias (English: Legendary Legends) is a Spanish-language podcast created by José Antonio Badía, Eduardo Espinosa, and Jorge Szewc and produced by All Things Comedy.

Background 
The show is a comedy podcast about strange history, which includes crime stories and paranormal events. The podcast is hosted by Eduardo Espinosa and José Antonio Badía in Ciudad Juárez, Chihuahua. Each episode is about one hour long. The show is produced by All Things Comedy and the executive producer is Jorge Szewc.

Reception 
The Capital Times called Leyendas Legendarias "one of Mexico's top podcasts" and the LA Times called it "the #1 Spanish-language podcast in the world."

Awards

References

External links 
 
2019 podcast debuts
Audio podcasts
History podcasts
Comedy and humor podcasts